Alejandro Bracho (born June 11, 1955) is a Mexican actor.

He starred in the 1989 James Bond film Licence to Kill as Perez, a henchman of the drug baron Franz Sanchez. Bracho also starred opposite Raul Julia as Father Alfonso Ozuna, a Jesuit priest, in Romero [1988]. Other film credits in English include The Blue Iguana, Clear and Present Danger, Highway Patrolman and Barbarian Queen II. He appeared in approximately half a dozen Spanish-language films, including El Otro, Extraños Caminos and, more recently, Cinco de Mayo la Batalla (2013, acting mostly in English). He jumped to stardom on Mexican television with his hilarious portrayal of the bisexual villain Emilio Uriarte in the comedic telenovela Los Sanchez. Bracho currently resides in Mexico City, where he is an acting teacher and coach and occasionally acts.

Filmography

References

1955 births
Living people
Mexican male film actors
Male actors from Mexico City